El Far d'Empordà is a municipality in the comarca of Alt Empordà, Girona, Catalonia, Spain.

See also 
 Molí de la Torre, farmhouse in El Far d'Empordà

References

External links
 Government data pages 

Municipalities in Alt Empordà